Juan Carlos González Salvador (born 28 January 1964 in Bilbao) is a Spanish former cyclist.

Major results

1987
1st  National Road Race Championships
1st Stage 1 Étoile de Bessèges
1988
1st Stage 4 Vuelta a Aragón
1st Stage 6 Vuelta a Asturias
3rd Vuelta a La Rioja
1990
1st Stage 1b Vuelta a Venezuela
2nd Clásica de Sabiñánigo
1991
1st  National Road Race Championships
2nd Overall Vuelta a Castilla y León
1992
1st Trofeo Soller
1st Stage 1b Vuelta a Castilla y León
2nd Clásica Internacional de Alcobendas
1993
1st Stage 10 Vuelta a España
2nd Trofeo Luis Puig

References

1964 births
Living people
Spanish male cyclists
Sportspeople from Bilbao
Cyclists from the Basque Country (autonomous community)